National Route 142 is a national highway of Japan connecting Karuizawa, Nagano and Shimosuwa, Nagano in Japan, with a total length of 77.3 km (48.03 mi).

Route
Wada Pass (Nagano)

Condition

References

142
Roads in Nagano Prefecture